is a Japanese voice actress from Fukui Prefecture.

Biography and career
Chika Anzai was born in Fukui Prefecture on December 22, 1990. She first learned about the voice acting industry in the 5th grade. At the age of 15, she joined the Avex Artist Academy. While she originally commuted between Fukui and Tokyo, the tremendous cost of transportation encouraged her to move to the capital. She lived there on her own, returning to her home in Fukui once per month to attend high school.

At the age of 19, she made her debut as the lead role of the anime television series Anyamaru Tantei Kiruminzuu, Nagisa Mikogami.

On August 1, 2020, Anzai announced that she had recently gotten married. In 2023, she was a recipient of the Best Lead Actor Award at the 17th Seiyu Awards.

Filmography

Television series
2009
Anyamaru Tantei Kiruminzuu – Nagisa Mikogami

2010
Seitokai Yakuindomo – Nanako Umibe

2011
Chihayafuru – Yuu, Taichi's girlfriend, etc
Un-Go – Sumika Nakahashi

2012
Danball Senki W – Jasmine
Hunter × Hunter (2011) – List, Kurt, Mosquito
Soreike! Anpanman – Castanet-kun

2013
Attack on Titan – Mina Carolina
Chihayafuru 2 – Shiori Miyazaki, Fuyumasa Tsukuba, etc
Danball Senki Wars – Sakuya Hosono
Gatchaman Crowds – Yumi Hosaka
Valvrave the Liberator – Midori Akashi

2014
Chaika – The Coffin Princess – Chaika Trabant
Gundam Build Fighters Try – Meguta Yasu
Nobunaga the Fool – Kagome
Pokémon: XY – Rena
Riddle Story of Devil – Suzu Shutō
Seitokai Yakuindomo* – Nanako Umibe
Tribe Cool Crew – Yuji Shinsido

2015
Anti-Magic Academy: The 35th Test Platoon – Kiseki Kusanagi
Attack on Titan: Junior High – Mina Carolina
Chaos Dragon – Inori
Sky Wizards Academy – Amy
Sound! Euphonium – Reina Kōsaka
The Testament of Sister New Devil Burst – Fio

2016
Girlish Number – Kawahara
Grimgar of Fantasy and Ash – Mary
Qualidea Code – Asuha Chigusa
Schwarzesmarken  – Anett Hosenfeld
Sound! Euphonium 2 – Reina Kōsaka
Taboo Tattoo – Tōko Ichinose

2017
Chronos Ruler – Koyuki
Evil or Live – Shiori
Gintama. – Kamui (Child)
Idol Incidents – Isuzu Narukami
Puzzle & Dragons X – Ana
Sakura Quest – Maki Midorikawa
Scum's Wish – Hanabi Yasuraoka
Wake Up, Girls! New Chapter – Aya Mizuta

2018
Boruto: Naruto Next Generations – Ashina
Double Decker! Doug & Kirill – Katherine "K" Roshfall
Grand Blue – Chisa Kotegawa
Hakumei and Mikochi – Sen
Kokkoku: Moment by Moment – Juri Yukawa
Record of Grancrest War – Laura Hardley
Rokuhōdō Yotsuiro Biyori – Gin Yanokura (episode 7)
Seven Senses of the Re'Union – Elicia
Takunomi. – Nao Kiriyama

2019
Kandagawa Jet Girls – Manatsu Shiraishi
My Roommate Is a Cat – Nana Ōkami
O Maidens in Your Savage Season – Niina Sugawara

2020
Toilet-Bound Hanako-kun – Sakura Nanamine

2021
High-Rise Invasion – Ein 
SSSS.Dynazenon – Chise Asukagawa
Taisho Otome Fairy Tale – Ryō Atsumi
The Night Beyond the Tricornered Window – Erika Hiura
The Promised Neverland Season 2 – Barbara

2022
Lycoris Recoil – Chisato Nishikigi

2023
The Idolmaster Million Live! – Misaki Aoba

Films
Expelled from Paradise (2014) – Arhan
Sound! Euphonium: The Movie - Welcome to the Kitauji High School Concert Band (2016) – Reina Kōsaka
Sound! Euphonium: Todoketai Melody (2017) – Reina Kōsaka
Girls und Panzer das Finale (2017) – Oshida
Liz and the Blue Bird (2018) – Reina Kōsaka
Sound! Euphonium The Movie - Our Promise: A Brand New Day (2019) – Reina Kōsaka
Gridman Universe (2023) – Chise Asukagawa

Original video animation (OVA)
Seitokai Yakuindomo (2012) – Nanako Umibe
 Who's the Winner? (Surprise Test) (2014) – Suzu Shutō
Magical Suite Prism Nana (2015) – Mako Hiragi
 Escha Chron (2017) – Escha
 Fragtime (2019) – Yukari Kobayashi

Video games 
2016
 Alternative Girls – Machi Tendo

2017
 The Idolmaster Million Live!: Theater Days –  Misaki Aoba

2018
 Alice Gear Aegis – Kaede Agatsuma, Asuka Fumishima
 Granblue Fantasy – Shitori
 Shin Megami Tensei: Liberation Dx2 –  Shiori Koden

2019
 Astral Chain – Protagonist (Female), Akira Howard (Female)

2020
Kandagawa Jet Girls – Manatsu Shiraishi
Girls' Frontline – PM-06, SAR-21

2021
Azur Lane – Chise Asukagawa

2022
Witch on the Holy Night – Kojika Kumari
 Arknights – Позёмка (Pozyomka)

Dubbing

Live-action
47 Meters Down: Uncaged – Sasha (Corinne Foxx)
Pretty Little Liars: Original Sin – Tabby Haworthe (Chandler Kinney)

Animation
My Little Pony: Tomodachi wa Mahou – Tree Hugger
Surf's Up 2: WaveMania – Paige

References

External links
Official agency profile 

1990 births
Japanese video game actresses
Japanese voice actresses
Living people
Seiyu Award winners
Voice actresses from Fukui Prefecture